The Love Ban is a 1973 British comedy film directed by Ralph Thomas and starring Hywel Bennett, Nanette Newman and Milo O'Shea. It was based on a play by Kevin Laffan. It is also known under the alternative titles of  It's a 2'6" Above the Ground World and Anyone for Sex?

Plot
A married couple with six children experience marital difficulties. Wife Kate refuses to sleep with husband Mick until he uses birth control, while their live-in au-pair falls pregnant.

Cast
 Hywel Bennett as Mick Goonahan
 Nanette Newman as Kate Goonahan
 Milo O'Shea as Father Andrew
 Angharad Rees as Jackie
 Nicky Henson as Baker
 Georgina Hale as Joyce
 Madeline Smith as Miss Partridge
 Peter Barkworth as Bra Factory Director
 John Cleese as Contraceptives Lecturer
 Marianne Stone as Customer In Chemists
 Nina Baden-Semper as Skyline Waitress
 Cheryl Hall as Pregnant Woman
 Jacki Piper as Pregnant Woman
 David Howey as Barber
 Tommy Godfrey as Barber
 James Leith as Policeman
 Tony Haygarth as Policeman

Production
The film was based on a 1969 play by Kevin Laffan, It's a 2'6" Above the Ground World. Laffan was one of 14 children from a devout Roman Catholic family and his critical view on the Church's stance on birth control was a recurring theme of his work. The play starred Prunella Scales in a production at the Bristol Old Vic, and was a hit, moving to the Wyndham's Theatre.

Filming
It was shot at Shepperton Studios with sets designed by the art director Anthony Pratt.

References

External links

1973 films
1970s English-language films
Films directed by Ralph Thomas
Films scored by Stanley Myers
1970s sex comedy films
British films based on plays
British sex comedy films
Films shot at Shepperton Studios
1973 comedy films
1970s British films